Rotonda can refer to:

 Rotonda, Florida
 Rotonda, Basilicata
 Villa Capra "La Rotonda", a building in Vicenza, Italy
 Rotunda (alternative spelling)
 The Rotonda Condominium in McLean, Virginia
 A term used by some Spanish-speaking or Spanish-influenced countries for a roundabout
 Rotonda (EP), 2017 EP by Gloc-9
 "Rotonda", a song on the EP Rotonda